The United States chemical weapons program began in 1917 during World War I with the creation of the U.S. Army's Gas Service Section and ended 73 years later in 1990 with the country's practical adoption of the Chemical Weapons Convention (signed 1993; entered into force, 1997). Destruction of stockpiled chemical weapons began in 1985 and is still ongoing. The U.S. Army Medical Research Institute of Chemical Defense, at Aberdeen Proving Ground, Maryland, continues to operate for purely defensive research and education purposes.

Agencies and organizations

Army agencies and schools
The U.S. chemical weapons programs have generally been run by the U.S. Army:
 
American Expeditionary Force Gas Service Section
American Expeditionary Force Chemical Service Section
U.S. Army Gas School
U.S. Army Edgewood Chemical Biological Center
U.S. Army Soldier and Biological-Chemical Command
United States Army Chemical Corps, originally the Chemical Warfare Service
United States Army Medical Research Institute of Chemical Defense
U.S. Army Chemical Materials Agency
Program Executive Office, Assembled Chemical Weapons Alternatives
United States Army CBRN School

Units
Chemical mortar battalion
1st Gas Regiment
2nd Chemical Mortar Battalion

Modern chemical depots
Active bases
Blue Grass Army Depot
Pueblo Chemical Depot

Closed bases
Johnston Atoll Chemical Agent Disposal System (closed 2000)
Edgewood Chemical Activity at Aberdeen Proving Ground (closed 2006)
Hawthorne Army Depot (eliminated shells 1999)
Newport Chemical Depot (closed 2008)
Pine Bluff Chemical Activity (closed 2014)
Umatilla Chemical Depot (closed 2014)
Anniston Chemical Activity (closed 2013)
Deseret Chemical Depot with Tooele Chemical Agent Disposal Facility (closed 2013)

Older chemical weapons program locations
Camp American University
Camp Leach
Dugway Proving Ground  
Rocky Mountain Arsenal
Navajo Ordnance Depot

Treaties, laws and policy
The U.S. is party to several treaties which limit chemical weapons:
Chemical Weapons Convention
Chemical Weapons Convention Implementation Act of 1998
Executive Order 11850
Executive Order 13049
Executive Order 13128
Hague Conventions (1899 and 1907)
Treaty relating to the Use of Submarines and Noxious Gases in Warfare - Failed because France objected to clauses relating to submarine warfare
Geneva Protocol
Public Law 99-145

Weapons

Canceled weapon projects
While these weapon systems were developed, they were not produced or stored in the US chemical weapons stockpile.
BIGEYE bomb
XM-736 8-inch binary projectile

Vehicles
LCI(M), infantry landing craft armed with 4.2 in mortar
M1135 Nuclear, Biological, Chemical, Reconnaissance Vehicle, a variation of the Stryker vehicle
M93 Fox
MQM-58 Overseer

Declared stockpile and other weapons
M1 chemical mine
M1 chemical bomb
M10 smoke tank
M104 155mm shell
M110A1/A2 155mm shell
M114 bomblet
M121/A1 155mm shell
M122 155mm shell

M125 bomblet, (developed as E54R6) chemical bomblet used with M34A1 cluster bomb
M134 bomblet, (developed as E130R1), chemical bomblet for use with Honest John rockets
M138 bomblet, sub-munition for the M43 cluster bomb
M139 cluster bomblets for the MGR-1 Honest John rocket and other missile systems
M2 mortar shell (M2A1) for the M2 4.2 Inch Mortar
M23 chemical mine
M34A1 cluster bomb (developed as E101R3), first U.S. air-delivered nerve agent weapon
M360 105mm shell
M426 8-inch shell
M43 cluster bomb
M44 generator cluster
M47 bomb, 100 lb. World War II-era chemical bomb
M55 rocket
M6 canister, BZ sub-munition for the M44 generator cluster
M60 105mm shell 
M687 155mm shell
MC-1 bomb
Mk 94 bomb
Mk 95 bomb
Weteye bomb, also known as the Mk-116 bomb

Stockpiled chemical agents

Agents stockpiled at the time of Chemical Weapons Convention:

isopropyl aminoethylmethyl phosphonite, or QL, part of a binary weapon (VX)
Methylphosphonyl difluoride (known to the military as DF) and a mixture of isopropyl alcohol and isopropyl amine (known as OPA), a binary chemical weapon (sarin)
Mustard gas
Sarin (GB)
VX
Rainbow Herbicides

Older chemical agents
Phosgene
Chlorine
BZ

Other equipment
Chemical Agent Identification Set (CAIS)
People sniffer

Exercises, incidents, and accidents

Operations and exercises
Operation Blue Skies
Operation CHASE, an operation that dumped conventional and chemical munitions at sea
Operation Davy Jones' Locker, a post-World War II operation aimed at dumping German chemical weapons at seas
Operation Geranium, a 1948 operation that dumped lewisite into the Atlantic Ocean.
Operation Paperclip, a program beginning in 1945 to bring German scientists to the U.S. 
Operation Ranch Hand, defoliant operations during the Vietnam War
Operation Red Hat, an early 1970 program to repatriate weapons from Okinawa
Operation Rock Ready, 1980's testing and rebuilding of the M17 series protective mask
Operation Snoopy, Vietnam War people sniffer operations.
Operation Steel Box, an operation which moved chemical weapons out of Germany in 1990.

Accidents
Bombing of the SS John Harvey during the Air Raid on Bari
Dugway sheep incident

Chemical testing
Edgewood Arsenal human experiments
Operation LAC, (Large Area Coverage), 1958 test that dropped microscopic particles over much of the United States
Operation Top Hat, a 1953 Chemical Corps exercise testing decontamination methods on human subjects
Project SHAD

Chemical defense program
United States Army Medical Research Institute of Chemical Defense

See also
List of U.S. biological weapons topics
United States and weapons of mass destruction
MK ULTRA, the CIA-led program to test various chemicals

References  

United States
Chemical warfare